Mike Nazaruk (October 2, 1921 Newark, New Jersey – May 1, 1955 Langhorne, Pennsylvania) was an American racecar driver. He raced midget cars, sprint cars, and IndyCars. He was nicknamed "Iron Mike."

Nazaruk was of Ukrainian descent. Before racing, he worked as a florist's delivery driver and as an aircraft welder.

Nazaruk served as a U.S. Marine in  the Battle of Guam and the Guadalcanal campaign in World War II. He promised himself that if he lived through the war he would become a race driver.

Midget car career
He raced after he returned home. He won the track championships at Staten Island, New York, and Rhinebeck, New York in 1947. He scored over twenty feature wins at Middletown, New York en route to winning the 1948 track championship.

Nazaruk was the 1949 American Racing Drivers Club (ARDC) midget car champion. The series tours the East Coast of the United States.

Nazaruk joined the AAA in 1950. He won 14 national midget tour events, including the 1950 Night Before the 500, and the first midget car event at Terre Haute Action Track in 1953. He finished fifth in the 1954 National Midget car points.

Championship car career
Nazaruk finished second in his first Indianapolis 500 in 1951. He competed in two more Indianapolis 500, including a fifth-place finish in 1954.

Nazaruk was killed in a sprint car race at Langhorne Speedway on May 1, 1955.

Career awards
He was inducted in the National Sprint Car Hall of Fame in 1996.
He was inducted in the National Midget Auto Racing Hall of Fame in 2003.

Complete AAA Championship Car results

Indianapolis 500 results

World Championship career summary
The Indianapolis 500 was part of the Formula One World Championship of Drivers from 1950 through 1960. Drivers competing at Indy during those years were credited with World Championship points and participation. Mike Nazaruk participated in three World Championship races. He finished second once (formally "on the podium") and accumulated a total of 8 World Championship points.

References

1921 births
1955 deaths
Indianapolis 500 drivers
National Sprint Car Hall of Fame inductees
Sportspeople from Newark, New Jersey
Racing drivers from New Jersey
Racing drivers who died while racing
Sports deaths in Pennsylvania
AAA Championship Car drivers